Baden railway station serves the municipality of Baden, in the canton of Aargau, Switzerland.  Opened in 1847, it is owned and operated by SBB-CFF-FFS.

The station forms part of the Bözberg railway line, which links Basel with Zürich. It is also on the Zürich–Baden railway and the Baden–Aarau railway, which both form part of the original line connecting Zürich and Olten.

Location
Baden railway station is situated in the Bahnhofstrasse, close to the centre of the town.
== Rail traffic ==

Long-distance 
The following long-distance services call at Baden:

InterRegio trains to Basel, Bern, Zürich HB and Zürich Airport.
RegioExpress trains to Olten and Wettingen.

S-Bahn

Aargau S-Bahn 
The station is a terminus of each of the following two lines in the Aargau S-Bahn network:

 : Langenthal – Olten – Aarau – Lenzburg – Brugg AG – Baden
 : Baden – Waldshut / Bad Zurzach

Zürich S-Bahn 
Baden is also served by three lines of the Zürich S-Bahn:

See also
*History of rail transport in Switzerland
Rail transport in Switzerland

References

External links

SBB-CFF-FFS - official site
 
Interactive station plan (Baden)

This article is based upon a translation of the German language version as at February 2013.

Railway stations in Switzerland opened in 1847
Railway station
Railway stations in the canton of Aargau
Swiss Federal Railways stations